Gurab-e Olya may refer to:
 Gurab-e Olya, Dehloran
 Gurab-e Olya, Shirvan and Chardaval